On January 4, 2023, Ana Walshe, a Serbian-American real estate executive, was reported missing by her employer and, separately, by her husband, Brian Walshe. Ana, who had residences in Cohasset, Massachusetts, and Washington, D.C., was last seen early on January 1 in Cohasset, having had dinner with Brian and a friend of his on New Year's Eve. Brian told the police that Ana had flown to D.C. for a work emergency. After an initial arrest on January 8 for misleading investigators regarding his whereabouts the day of the disappearance, Brian was charged on January 18 with murder and disinterring a body without authority, to which he pleaded not guilty; prosecutors allege that he beat her to death and dismembered and disposed of her body.

Background 
Ana Ljubičić was born in Belgrade, SR Serbia, SFR Yugoslavia, in 1983. She emigrated to the United States in 2005, eventually becoming a dual citizen. She found work in the hospitality industry, including at The Inn at Little Washington. According to Boston 25 News, she is thought to have met  Brian Walshe during her two years working at the Wheatleigh Hotel in Lenox, Massachusetts. She and Brian married in 2016 and she took his surname. They subsequently had three sons, who at the time of her disappearance were ages two, four, and six.

After working at several more hotels, Ana Walshe became a regional general manager at the real estate company Tishman Speyer in February 2022, splitting her time between her home with Brian in Cohasset, Massachusetts, and a residence in Washington, D.C., where she worked. 

In 2021, Brian pleaded guilty in federal court on three charges of fraud relating to selling counterfeit Andy Warhol works. At the time of Ana's disappearance, he was on house arrest awaiting sentencing.

Disappearance 

The Walshes and a friend of Brian's had dinner together on New Year's Eve 2022. In the first hours of 2023, she called her mother, sister, and maid of honor, all of whom were unavailable. She was last seen around 4 AM. Brian says he spent the following day in Swampscott with his mother.

On January 4, both Tishman Speyer and Brian Walshe reported Ana missing. Brian told the police that Ana had left the house early for a flight from Boston's Logan International Airport to Washington, D.C., after a work emergency caused her to move up a trip scheduled for January 3. Police could not confirm whether she had gotten on a flight or gotten a ride to the airport on January 1; they found that while she had indeed previously booked a flight for January 3, she had not gotten on it, and that her credit and debit cards had not been used since January 1.

Investigation and charges 
Brian Walshe was arrested on January 8 and charged with misleading the police in the investigation into Ana's disappearance, after police could not find evidence that he had been to the CVS or Whole Foods in Swampscott on January 1 as he had claimed. He pleaded not guilty. The prosecutor alleged that Brian had gone to Home Depot on January 2 and spent $450 on cleaning supplies. Police received a search warrant for the Walshe residence and in the basement found blood and a damaged, bloody knife.

On 18 January, Brian Walshe was arrested again and charged with murder and disinterring a body without authority. Prosecutors allege that he beat her to death, dismembered her, and then disposed of the body. As evidence they cited his Google search history on multiple devices including his son's iPad, which they allege includes terms like "How long before a body starts to smell", "Dismemberment and the best ways to dispose of a body", and "Can you be charged with murder without a body". Brian pleaded not guilty.

The event gained significant public attention in the United States and Serbia. Serbia's Ministry of Foreign Affairs has communicated, through the Serbian consulate-general in New York, with the Norfolk District Attorney's office, in order to provide Ana Walshe's mother with non-publicly available information about the course of the investigation.

Notes

References 

2023 in Massachusetts
2020s missing person cases
January 2023 crimes in the United States
Missing person cases in Massachusetts
Cohasset, Massachusetts